Kladnitsa is a village in Southern Bulgaria. The village is located in Pernik Municipality, Pernik Province. Аccording to the numbers provided by the 2020 Bulgarian census, Kladnica currently has a population of 1277 people with a permanent address registration in the settlement.

Geography 
Kladnitsa village is located in the Southern parts of Vitosha mountain. Some mountain routes leading to Cherni Vrah, the highest peak in the mountain pass through the village, making it an attractive tourist destination.

Dam Studena is located 4 kilometers away from the village. 

It is one of the oldest villages in the mountain. It is located at an average elevation of 999 meters. The village is located 22 kilometers away from the capital Sofia, and 16 kilometers away from Pernik.

Buildings 

 There is an elementary school “Kliment Ohridski” in the village. 
 The community hall and library “Probuda” was built in 1937.

Mountain routes 
Many of the mountain routes from the capital Sofia in the Vitosha mountain pass through Kladnitsa village.

Two of them start from Boyana District, pass through the village, and head for Cherni Vrah. There is the Kladnishka river, which passes near the village, which also makes it an attractive place for hiking.

Ethnicity 
According to the Bulgarian population census in 2011.

References 

Villages in Pernik Province